Professional baseball has been played in Pawtucket, Rhode Island since 1892 and continually since 1970. The first team to call Pawtucket home, the Secrets of the New England League, disbanded on July 26, 1892 with a dismal 17–43 record. The team played its games on the Dexter Street grounds, which housed two other Pawtucket teams in the New England League through 1899.

Following the Secrets (1892), the Maroons (1894-95, 97-99) and Phenoms (1896) called Pawtucket home. After the Maroons were expelled in August 1899, Pawtucket would be without baseball until 1908, although the Colts of the Class C Atlantic Association lasted only 9 games before disbanding and leaving Pawtucket without a team for 6 more seasons.

In 1914 the Rovers joined the Class C Colonial League, playing their games at the Sabin Street grounds in the Royal Square area, but were kicked out in August 1915 because of an affiliation with a competing league.

McCoy Stadium, named in honor of Thomas P. McCoy, the Mayor of Pawtucket from 1936 to 1945, was dedicated just in time for the return of professional baseball in 1946 as the Pawtucket Slaters of the Class B New England League debuted. The Slaters lasted 4 full seasons, but in 1950 the New England League disbanded and 8-year old McCoy Stadium was left without a permanent tenant.

That would change in 1966 when the Cleveland Indians' Double-A Eastern League team, the Pawtucket Indians, relocated to Pawtucket. The Indians left after the 1967 season but professional baseball, and the Eastern League, would return to McCoy in 1970 when the city's affiliation with the Boston Red Sox began. After 3 seasons (1970-72) as a host to Boston's Double-A affiliate, the Pawtucket Red Sox moved their Triple-A operation to Pawtucket in time for the 1973 season and the team has remained there since. The 1973 PawSox were the first Pawtucket team ever to win a league championship, a feat they repeated in 1984.

Pawtucket Red Sox
Baseball in Rhode Island